Alfredo Pérez Rubalcaba (28 July 1951 – 10 May 2019) was a Spanish statesman, politician and chemist who served as Deputy Prime Minister of Spain from 2010 to 2011, and previously as Minister of Education from 1992 to 1993, as Minister of the Presidency from 1993 to 1996, as Minister of the Interior from 2006 to 2011 and as acting Minister of Defence between May and June 2008.

He also served as Leader of the Opposition from 2011 to 2014 and as Secretary-General of the Spanish Socialist Workers' Party (PSOE) from 2012 to 2014. He obtained a PhD in Organic Chemistry at the Complutense University of Madrid.

Life and career
He was born in Solares village, municipality of Medio Cudeyo, in the province of Santander. Moved at age 3 to Madrid with his family, he studied at the Colegio del Pilar. He obtained a doctorate in chemistry at Complutense University in Madrid, where he went on to become a professor of chemistry, specialising in reaction mechanisms in organic chemistry. He represented Toledo in Congress from 1993 to 1996, Madrid from 1996 until 2004, Cantabria from 2004 to 2008 and, despite not being Andalusian, was put forward for the safe parliamentary seat of Cádiz in the 2008 election, which he won. He was also a passionate and practitioner of athletics, reaching the 100 meter run in 11 seconds.

González cabinet
Rubalcaba was appointed Secretary of State for Education in 1986 and in 1992 he was promoted to Minister of Education and Science by Prime Minister Felipe González. After the 1993 general election he was appointed Minister of the Presidency and Relations with the Cortes and Spokesperson of the Government until 1996 when his party lost the general election. He was re-elected MP for Madrid. As a Minister he had to face the accusations that involved the government of Felipe González with the GAL paramilitary group.

Interior minister and deputy prime minister
For the 2004 Spanish general election, Rubalcaba was responsible for the electoral strategy of the PSOE. Some political analysts attribute him a decisive role in the socialist victory.

After the constitution of the Cortes Generales, Pérez Rubalcaba was appointed Leader of the Socialist Group in the Congress of Deputies. On 11 April 2006 he replaced José Antonio Alonso as head of the Ministry of the Interior. It was in this ministry where he gained popularity within his party, thanks, among other measures, to the change of direction in the fight against terrorism that led to the end of the violence of ETA. However, several media and political parties accused Rubalcaba of being involved in the Faisán case, about an extortion network of ETA, a fact that has not been verified.

After the socialist victory in the general elections of 2008, Pérez Rubalcaba was renewed in the ministerial portfolio, occupying again the position of Minister of the Interior to exercise during the IX Legislature. Between 20 May and 30 June 2008 he assumed the duties of Minister of Defense temporarily during the maternity leave of the head of the department, Carme Chacón, combining these functions with his work in front of Interior.

He replaced on 21 October 2010 María Teresa Fernández de la Vega as First Deputy Prime Minister and Spokesperson of the Government, accumulating these charges to the head of the Interior portfolio.

On 10 January 2011, ETA declared that their September 2010 ceasefire would be permanent and verifiable by international observers. On 20 October 2011, the Basque terrorist group, after 43 years of activity and more than 800 deaths in Spain, announced its definitive cessation of violence.

As minister he also had to face the high accident rate on Spanish roads. His mandate was the most successful in history in reducing the number of fatalities and became a benchmark at European level.

Premiership candidate 
As it became assumed that President Zapatero was not going to seek reelection he became favorite to succeed him with Carme Chacón as his only rival in the primaries. Nevertheless, in May 2011, Chacón announced that she was withdrawing from the race and in June the Party announced that no other candidate had filed and Rubalcaba became the PSOE's candidate to the premiership for the 2011 general elections. On 8 July 2011, he resigned from his duties in the government in order to focus on the general election campaign, which he lost getting the worst results in PSOE's history.

He filed to succeed José Luis Rodríguez Zapatero as PSOE's General Secretary and won the vote, held on 6 February 2012. He received 487 votes against 465 for Carme Chacón.

Stepping down and later life

Due to the bad results of the party in the 2014 European Parliament election, on 26 May 2014 he resigned of the office. After a leadership election, Rubalcaba was succeeded by the newly elected Secretary General Pedro Sánchez on 13 July 2014.

In September 2016 it was announced that Pérez Rubalcaba rejoined his position as Chemistry professor at the Complutense University of Madrid and, in addition, he joined the editorial board of the Spanish newspaper El País, of which he was part until July 2018.

Amid the 2019 Madrid City Council election, on 26 December 2018 he rejected the proposal of Pedro Sánchez to be the PSOE candidate for mayor of Madrid.

Death
Rubalcaba was admitted to the Puerta de Hierro Hospital, in Majadahonda, on 8 May 2019 when he had suffered a severe stroke after teaching in the university. He died two days later aged 67 and PSOE cancelled all the acts of the first day of the campaign for local elections.

He had a funeral with state honors at the Congress of Deputies.

References

External links
 Alfredo Pérez Rubalcaba Biography 
 Listo para el gran sprint. El Pais article

|-

|-

|-

|-

|-

|-

|-

1951 births
2019 deaths
Complutense University of Madrid
Politicians from Cantabria
Complutense University of Madrid alumni
Deputy Prime Ministers of Spain
Government ministers of Spain
Leaders of political parties in Spain
Members of the 5th Congress of Deputies (Spain)
Members of the 6th Congress of Deputies (Spain)
Members of the 7th Congress of Deputies (Spain)
Members of the 8th Congress of Deputies (Spain)
Members of the 9th Congress of Deputies (Spain)
Members of the 10th Congress of Deputies (Spain)
People from Trasmiera
Spanish chemists
Spanish Socialist Workers' Party politicians
Interior ministers of Spain
Secretaries of State of Spain